Cerro Batoví is a hill in Uruguay, with an altitude of 224 metres (734.9 ft). It is situated 25 km (15.5 mi) away from the city of Tacuarembó.

Location and features

It is located in the Tacuarembó Department, in a range of hills named Cuchilla de Haedo. Batoví means "breast of a virgin" in the Guaraní language and the hill has this name due to its curious shape.

Cerro Batoví is considered the symbol of the Tacuarembó Department.

See also
Breast-shaped hill
Cerro Catedral
Cerro de las Ánimas
Cerro Pan de Azúcar
Geography of Uruguay

External links
 Enciclopedia Geográfica del Uruguay.

Hills of Uruguay